Andrey Alexandrovich Koryakovcev (born 23 November 1966 in Kirov, Kirov Oblast) is a Russian scientist, philosopher and sociologist, author.
He is scholar of Marxism, PhD, Docent of the Ural State Pedagogical University.
He is also a political analyst.

He graduated from the Ural State University.

Currently lives in Yekaterinburg.
Laureate of the Regional Prize for Best Book.

Koryakovcev is a member of the Union of Russian Writers.

Is author of more than 70 scientific papers, two monographs.

References

1966 births
Scholars of Marxism
Living people